Sebastianópolis do Sul is a municipality in the state of São Paulo in Brazil. The population is 3,554 (2020 est.) in an area of 168 km². The elevation is 468 m.

References

Municipalities in São Paulo (state)